Balapitiya Hewage Hasaru Liyam Chaamikara (born 16 July 1998) is a Sri Lankan cricketer. He made his List A debut for Sri Lanka Air Force Sports Club in the 2017–18 Premier Limited Overs Tournament on 10 March 2018.

References

External links
 

1998 births
Living people
Sri Lankan cricketers
Sri Lanka Air Force Sports Club cricketers
People from Galle